Chan Ma Kan (born 6 March 1971) is a karateka from Hong Kong, China who won a bronze medal at the 2006 Asian Games in the women's kumite -60 kg class.

References 

Living people
1971 births
Hong Kong female karateka
Place of birth missing (living people)
Asian Games medalists in karate
Karateka at the 2002 Asian Games
Karateka at the 2006 Asian Games
Karateka at the 2010 Asian Games
Asian Games silver medalists for Hong Kong
Asian Games bronze medalists for Hong Kong
Medalists at the 2002 Asian Games
Medalists at the 2006 Asian Games
Medalists at the 2010 Asian Games
20th-century Hong Kong women
21st-century Hong Kong women